This is a list of fossiliferous stratigraphic units in Niger.



List of fossiliferous stratigraphic units

See also 
 Lists of fossiliferous stratigraphic units in Africa
 List of fossiliferous stratigraphic units in Mali
 Geology of Niger

References

Further reading 
 R. Damiani, C. A. Sidor, J. S. Steyer, R. M. H. Smith, H. C. E. Larsson, A. Maga, and O. Ide. 2006. The Vertebrate Fauna of the Upper Permian of Niger. V. The Primitive Temnospondyl Saharastega moradiensis. Journal of Vertebrate Paleontology 26(3):559-572
 A. F. d. Lapparent. 1960. Les Dinosauriens du "Continental intercalaire" du Saharal central [The dinosaurs of the "Continental Intercalaire" of the central Sahara]. Mémoires de la Société géologique de France, nouvelle série 39(88A):1-57
 T. Lingham-Soliar. 1998. A new mosasaur Pluridens walkeri from the Upper Cretaceous, Maastrichtian of the Iullemmeden Basin, southwest Niger. Journal of Vertebrate Paleontology 18(4):709-707
 C. Meister, K. Alazouma, J. Lang, B. Mathey, and A. Pascal. 1994. Nouvelles données sur les ammonites du Niger oriental (Ténéré, Afrique occidentale) dans le cadre de la transgression du Cénomanien-Turonien. Geobios 27:189-219
 A. K. Miller. 1951. Tertiary nautiloids of west-coastal Africa. Annales du Museé du Congo Belge Tervuren, Sciences Géologiques 8:1-88
 K. Remes, F. Ortega, I. Fierro, U. Joger, R. Kosma, J. M. M. Ferrer, Project, Niger Project, O. A. Ide and A. Maga. 2009. A new basal sauropod dinosaur from the Middle Jurassic of Niger and the early evolution of Sauropoda. PLoS One 4(9):e6924:1-13
 A. d. Ricqlès and P. Taquet. 1982. La Faune de Vertébrés du Permien Supérieur du Niger I. Le Captorhinomorphe Moradisaurus grandis (Reptilia, Cotylosauria) - Le Crâne. Annales de Paléontologie 68(1):33-106
 J. S. Steyer, R. Damiani, C. A. Sidor, F. R. O'Keefe, H. C. E. Larsson, A. Maga, and O. Ide. 2006. The Vertebrate Fauna of the Upper Permian of Niger. IV. Nigerpeton ricqlesi (Temnospondyli: Cochleosauridae), and the Edopoid Colonization of Gondwana. Journal of Vertebrate Paleontology 26(1):18-28
 P. M. Zaborski and N.J. Morris. 1999. The Late Cretaceous ammonite genus Libycoceras in the Iullemmeden Basin (West Africa) and its palaeogeographical significance. Cretaceous Research 20:63-79

Niger
 
Fossiliferous stratigraphic units
Fossil
Fossil